Richard Southwell (c. 1449 – 27 September 1514) was a 15th-century British administrator from Norfolk. He was a Marshal of the Exchequer and an administrator for the Duke of Norfolk.

Early life
Richard Southwell was the son of Robert Southwell of Barnham, Norfolk and his wife Isabel Boyes.

Career
During the second half of the fifteenth century, the Southwell name appears increasingly in government matters, with Richard being appointed to a number of commissions and administrative posts. Richard was the Member of Parliament for Yarmouth in 1455 and Escheator of Norfolk in 1455–56, 1459–60 and 1474. 

Robert Boys who owned land in Norfolk gave his mother, Sibylle Boys, power of attorney over his interests and he died six years later in 1440, leaving a widow, Jane Boys, and a daughter, Katherine. Jane was, at some time, promised in marriage to Southwell, but before the marriage could take place she was taken by Robert Langstrother. In retaliation Southwell took possession of Sibylle Boys' manor of Holme Hale in 1451. Researchers are divided as to whether Jane went willingly with Langstrother to avoid a forced marriage to Southwell, or whether Southwell was the heroic would-be rescuer of Jane taken by force by Langstrother. At the time Sibylle Boys set off for London to claim restitution from the King and his Lords.

In 1461 Southwell was granted an annuity of 20 marks until he was provided for life with an office with fees of that value. In 1462 Richard was appointed to the office of Marshal of the Exchequer with its accustomed fees during the minority of the son of the Duke of Norfolk. In 1475, with Thomas Archbishop of Canterbury and others, Richard was made responsible for the Duke's manors in Suffolk and Essex, while the Duke was across the sea with King Edward IV.

In 1477, he was again involved with the affairs of Yarmouth; this time as a member of a commission into a complaint by two Prussian merchants. At this time trade with Germany was an important part of the English economy, and any problems were taken seriously. Henry Faute and Hamo Barambroke had complained that a ship called la Mary of Danske, captained by Peter Eybryght, laden with goods and merchandise to the value of £600, while sailing off Yarmouth was driven ashore by evildoers who stole the cargo. This they claimed was contrary to the friendship between the King and Almain, and the offenders should be arrested and imprisoned and restitution made. In 1482, he was a commissioner examining Thomas and Margaret Brygge regarding certain felonies, murders, trespasses and offences committed by them. An unusual commission was one in 1491, when he had to determine whether Sir William Parker was a lunatic from birth or from what date and whether he alienated his lands when in that state. From 1496 to 1504 he was a commissioner of the peace for Norfolk.

Marriage and family
In 1466 Richard married Amy, the coheir and eldest of the four daughters of Edmund Witchingham of Conningsby, Lincolnshire.  Since she was an heiress, this marriage established the family at Woodrising, Norfolk.

Richard and his wife Amy had two sons, Robert and Francis, and four daughters, Elizabeth, Katherine, Alice and Amy. The children of Richard Southwell and Amy Witchingham:

 Sir Robert Southwell (d. 30 March 1514), m. 1) Ursula Bohun, daughter of John Bohun of Medhurst in Sussex, 2) Elizabeth Calthorpe (d.1517), the daughter of Sir Philip Calthorpe of Burnham Thorpe, Norfolk. She would go on to become the second wife of Thomas Brooke, 8th Baron Cobham. Sir Robert died childless and his heir was his brother Francis' eldest son Richard.
 Francis Southwell (d. 2 September 1512), auditor of the Exchequer, m. Dorothy, daughter and co-heiress of William Tendring, Esquire, of Stoke by Naylond in Suffolk and Little Birch in Essex and Thomasine, daughter of William Sidney. Francis and Dorothy were the parents of:
 Sir Richard Southwell (c.1502/03 – 11 January 1564), Privy councillor and one of the executors of the will of Henry VIII
 Sir Robert Southwell (c.1506–1559), civil servant during the reigns of Henry VIII, Edward VI and Mary I, Member of Parliament, High Sheriff of Kent, and one of the key loyalist officers engaged against the Wyatt's rebellion
 Francis Southwell (d. 1581) auditor of the exchequer under Henry VIII and Member of Parliament
 Anthony Southwell, m. Anne Le Strange, daughter of Sir Thomas Le Strange
 Katherine, m. Anthony Hansard and buried in the North aisle of March Church in the Isle of Ely in 1507
 Elizabeth, m. John Holdich
 Katherine
 Alice, m. John Berney of Redham
 Amy, m. Ralph Berney of Wichingham

Richard was engaged to Jane Boys in 1451 (see above).

Richard married, in 1488, the widow Katherine Sturges, daughter of John Williams, and had four more daughters, Katherine, Ursula, Amy and Elizabeth. The children of Richard Southwell and Katherine Sturges née Williams:

 Katherine, m. Edmund Jenney of Intwood
 Ursula, m. John Curson of Billingford
 Amy, m. William Wotton of North Tudenham, Baron of the Exchequer, and in 1527 lord of the Manor of St. Cleere
 Elizabeth, m. Robert Crane of Suffolk

The status of the Southwell family in East Anglian society is reflected in the marriages of Richard's daughters, who largely married members of the minor aristocracy of the region.

References

1449 births
1514 deaths
People from Barnham Broom
People from Breckland District